Miguel Ángel González may refer to:

 Miguel Ángel González Suárez (born 1947), Spanish football goalkeeper
 Miguel Ángel González (boxer) (born 1970), Mexican boxer
 Miguel Ángel González (Argentine footballer) (born 1983), known as El Mágico, Argentine football midfielder
 Mike González (baseball catcher) (1890–1977), Cuban baseball catcher and manager
 Migue (born 1980), Spanish football defender

See also
Miguel González (disambiguation)
Mike Gonzalez (disambiguation)